Charles William Brueckman (born November 23, 1935) is a former American football offensive lineman. He played in the National Football League (NFL) for the Washington Redskins and for the Los Angeles Chargers of the American Football League (AFL). He played college football at the University of Pittsburgh and was drafted in the ninth round of the 1957 NFL Draft.

See also
 List of American Football League players

References

1935 births
Living people
American football centers
Los Angeles Chargers players
People from McKees Rocks, Pennsylvania
Pittsburgh Panthers football players
Players of American football from Pennsylvania
Sportspeople from the Pittsburgh metropolitan area
Washington Redskins players